The Chilean corvette Constitución was built by the Juan Duprat shipyard in Valparaíso under a Chilean law of year 1847 in that same year and was launched on 19 January 1851. It was the first warship to be built completely in Chile, excluding the guns which were made in France. The copper plates to protect the hull were made by Lambert in Coquimbo.

During the revolution of 1851 she adhered to the cause of the government.

Constitución was decommissioned in 1856 and disarmed in 1857.

References

External links 
 Chilean corvette Constitución at the Chilean Navy's official homepage
 Chilean corvette Constitución by Gerardo Etcheverry
 Chilean site Historia Naval,  Buques de la Armada construidos en Chile by Germán Bravo Valdivieso.

Constitucion (1851)
1851 ships